

E

 E: (2006 & 2017)
 E.A. — Extraordinary Accident (1958)
 E.T. the Extra-Terrestrial (1982)

Ea

 Each Dawn I Die (1939)
 Eagle (1990)
 The Eagle: (1918, 1925, 1959 & 2011)
 Eagle Eye (2008)
 Eagle Flute (2009)
 The Eagle Has Landed (1976)
 The Eagle Huntress (2016)
 Eagle of the Night (1928)
 The Eagle of the Sea (1926)
 Eagle vs Shark (2007)
 The Eagle's Talons (1923)
 The Ear (1990)
 The Earl of Chicago (1940)
 Early to Bed (1928)
 Early Spring (1956)
 Early Summer (1951)
 The Earrings of Madame de… (1953)
 Earth: (1930, 1996, 1998 & 2007)
 The Earth Is Blue as an Orange (2020)
 Earth Days (2009)
 Earth to Echo (2014)
 Earth vs. the Flying Saucers (1956)
 Earth Girls Are Easy (1988)
 The Earth Is a Sinful Song (1973)
 Earth vs. the Spider: (1958 & 2001 TV)
 Earth's Man (1917)
 Earthquake (1974)
 Earwig and the Witch (2020)
 The East: (2013 & 2020)
 East Is East: (1916 & 1999)
 East of Eden (1955)
 East of Havana (2006)
 East Lynne: (1913, 1916, 1921, 1922, 1925 & 1931)
 East of the Mountains (2021)
 East Palace, West Palace (1996)
 The East Is Red: (1965 & 1993)
 East River (2008)
 East of Shanghai (1931)
 East Side Kids (1940)
 East Side Story: (1997 & 2006)
 Easter Parade (1948)
 Easter Sunday (2022)
 Eastern Condors (1987)
 Eastern Promises (2007)
 An Eastern Westerner (1920)
 Easy A (2010)
 Easy Come, Easy Go (1967)
 Easy Living: (1937, 1949 & 2017)
 Easy Money: (1917, 1925, 1934, 1936, 1948, 1983 & 2010)
 Easy Rider (1969)
 Easy Street (1917)
 Easy Virtue: (1928 & 2008)
 Eat (1963)
 Eat Drink Man Woman (1994)
 Eat Hot Tofu Slowly (2005)
 Eat Pray Love (2010)
 Eat the Rich (1987)
 Eat Your Makeup (1968)
 Eaten Alive (1976)
 Eaten Alive! (1980)
 Eating Out (2004)
 Eating Out 2: Sloppy Seconds (2006)
 Eating Raoul (1982)
 Eaux d'artifice (1953)
 The Eavesdropper (1964)

Eb-Ek

 Ebb Tide: (1922, 1932 & 1937)
 Ebba the Movie (1982)
 Ebenezer (1998) (TV)
 Ebola Syndrome (1996)
 Ebony, Ivory & Jade (1976)
 Ebony Parade (1947)
 Eccentricities of a Blonde-Haired Girl (2009)
 Echelon Conspiracy (1962)
 Echo in the Canyon (2018)
 Echo Park: (1986 & 2014)
 The Echo of Thunder (1998) (TV)
 Eclipse: (1962 & 1994)
 The Eclipse (2009)
 Eclipse de sol (1943)
 Ecstasy (1933)
 Ed (1996)
 Ed Gein (2000)
 Ed Wood (1994)
 Ed's Next Move (1996)
 La Edad del amor (1954)
 Eddie and the Cruisers (1983)
 Eddie and the Cruisers II: Eddie Lives! (1989)
 Eddie Murphy Delirious (1983)
 Eddie Murphy Raw (1987)
 Eddie's Million Dollar Cook-Off (2003) (TV)
 The Eddy Duchin Story (1956)
 Eden Lake (2008)
 Eden Log (2007)
 Eden Valley (1994)
 The Edge: (1997 & 2010)
 Edge of the City (1957)
 Edge of Darkness: (1943 & 2010)
 Edge of Doom (1950)
 The Edge of Heaven (2007)
 Edge of Innocence (2016)
 The Edge of Love (2008)
 Edge of Seventeen (1998)
 Edges of the Lord (2000)
 Edge of Tomorrow (2014) 
 Edición extra (1949)
 Edie & Thea: A Very Long Engagement (2009)
 Edipo Alcalde (1996)
 Edison (2005)
 Edison Bugg's Invention (1916)
 Edison and Leo (2008)
 Edison, the Man (1940)
 Edison, Marconi & Co. (1928)
 Edmond (2005)
 EDtv (1999)
 Educating Rita (1983)
 An Education (2009)
 The Education of Charlie Banks (2007)
 Education of a Prince (1927)
 The Edukators (2004)
 Edvard Munch (1953)
 Edward II (1991)
 Edward Scissorhands (1990)
 Edward, My Son (1949)
 Eegah (1962)
 Efectos secundarios (2006)
 The Effect of Gamma Rays on Man-in-the-Moon Marigolds (1972)
 Effi Briest: (1971, 1974 & 2009)
 The Egg and I (1947)
 Eggs (1995)
 Ego: (2013, 2018 & 2021)
 The Egyptian (1954)
 Eien no 1/2 (1987)
 Eierdiebe (2003)
 Eiffel (2021)
 Eiga ST Aka to Shirō no Sōsa File (2015)
 The Eiger Sanction (1975)
 Eight Below (2006)
 Eight Crazy Nights (2002)
 Eight Days a Week (1998)
 The Eight Diagram Pole Fighter (1984)
 The Eighth House (2014)
 Eight Legged Freaks (2002)
 Eight Men Out (1988)
 Eight for Silver (2021)
 Eight Thousand Li of Cloud and Moon (1947)
 The Eighth Day (1997)
 Eighth Grade (2018)
 Eijanaika (1981)
 Einstein (2008) (TV)
 Einstein and Eddington (2008) (TV)
 Der Einstein des Sex (1999)
 The Einstein Theory of Relativity (1923)
 Ek Aur Ek Gyarah (2003)
 Ek Deewana Tha (2013)
 Ek Villain (2015)
 Ek Chhotisi Love Story (2002)
 Ek Khiladi Ek Haseena (2005)
 Ek Thi Daayan (2013)
 Ek Ladki Ko Dekha Toh Aisa Laga (2019)
 Ek Ladka Ek Ladki (1992)
 Ek Tha Tiger (2012)
 Eko Eko Azarak: Wizard of Darkness (1995)

El

 Él (1953)
 Elanne Starlight (2016)
 Election: (1999 & 2005)
 Election 2 (2006)
 Electra (1962)
 Electra Glide in Blue (1973)
 Electra, My Love (1974)
 Electric Dragon 80.000 V (2001)
 Electric Dreams (1984)
 The Electric Horseman (1979)
 The Electric Kool-Aid Acid Test (2009)
 Electric Shadows (2004)
 The Electrical Life of Louis Wain (2021)
 Electronic Labyrinth: THX 1138 4EB (1967)
 Elegy (2008)
 Elektra: (2005 & 2010)
 Elektra Luxx (2010)
 The Element of Crime (1984)
 Elena: (2011 & 2012)
 Elena and Her Men (1956)
 Elephant: (1989, 1993, 2003, 2019 & 2020)
 Elephant Boy (1937)
 An Elephant Called Slowly (1969)
 The Elephant Man (1980)
 An Elephant Sitting Still (2018)
 Elephant Song (2014)
 Elephant Walk (1954)
 Eleven Men Out (2005)
 Eleven Years and One Day (1963)
 Elevated (1997)
 Elevator to the Gallows (1958)
 Elf (2003)
 Elf Bowling(2007)
 Elfie Hopkins (2012)
 Eli: (2015 & 2019)
 Elisa, vida mía (1977)
 Elite Squad (2007)
 Elite Squad: The Enemy Within (2010)
 Elizabeth (1998)
 Elizabeth Harvest (2018)
 Elizabeth: The Golden Age (2007)
 Elizabethan Express (1954)
 Elizabethtown (2005)
 Ella Enchanted (2004)
 Ella, él y sus millones (1944)
 Elle (2016)
 Elles (2011)
 Ellie (1984)
 Elling (2001)
 Ellis Island (1936)
 Ellos nos hicieron así (1952)
 Elmer Gantry (1960)
 Elmer, the Great (1933)
 Elmer's Candid Camera (1940)
 Elmer's Pet Rabbit (1941)
 Eloy (1969)
 Elsa y Fred (2005)
 Elsewhere: (2001, 2009 & 2019)
 Elstree 1976 (2015)
 Elves (1989)
 Elvira Fernández, vendedora de tiendas (1942)
 Elvira's Haunted Hills (2001)
 Elvira, Mistress of the Dark (1988)
 Elvis: (1979 TV & 2022)
 Elvis and Anabelle (2007)
 Elvis Has Left the Building (2004)
 Elvis: That's the Way it Is (1970)
 Elysium (2013)

Em

 Em Busca de Iara (2013)
 Em Câmara Lenta (2012)
 Em Magan (2006)
 Ema (2019)
 Ema Nudar Umanu (2018)
 Emancipation: (2011 & 2022)
 Emanuelle in America (1977)
 Emanuelle Around the World (1977)
 Emanuelle and the Last Cannibals (1984)
 Emanuelle and the White Slave Trade (1978)
 Emanuelle's Revenge (1975)
 The Embalmer: (1965 & 2002)
 Embargo (2010)
 Embarrassing Moments: (1930 & 1934)
 Embattled (2020)
 Embassy (1972)
 Embedded (2016)
 Ember (2016)
 Embers: (1916 & 2015)
 Embodiment of Evil (2008)
 Embrace (2016)
 Embrace Again (2021)
 Embrace of the Serpent (2015)
 Embrace of the Vampire: (1995 & 2013)
 Embraceable You (1948)
 Embrujada (1969)
 Embrujo antillano (1947)
 Embrujo en Cerros Blancos (1955)
 Embryo (1976)
 Emelie (2015)
 Emerald City (1988)
 Emerald of the East (1929)
 The Emerald Forest (1985)
 Emergency (1962)
 Emergency Act 19 (2002)
 Emergency Call: (1933 & 1952)
 Emergency Declaration (2021)
 Emergency Landing: (1941 & 1952)
 Emergency Squad: (1940 & 1974)
 Emergency Ward (1952)
 Emergency Wedding (1950)
 Emerging (1985 TV)
 The Emigrant: (1940 & 1994)
 The Emigrants (1971)
 Emil and the Detectives: (1931, 1935, 1954, 1964 & 2001)
 Emil i Lönnebarga (1971)
 Emil and the Piglet (1973)
 Emile (2003)
 Emile the African (1949)
 Emile's Boat (1962)
 Emilia Galotti (1958)
 Emiliano Zapata (1970)
 Emilie Högquist (1939)
 Emilio (2008)
 Emily: (1976 & 2022)
 Emily Brontë's Wuthering Heights (1992)
 Emily the Criminal (2022)
 Emily & Tim (2015)
 Eminence Hill (2019)
 Eminent Domain (1990)
 Emir (2010)
 Emiti Bi Prema Hue (2012)
 Emma: (1932, 1972 TV, 1996 & 1996 TV)
 Emmanuelle (1974)
 Emmanuelle 2 (1975)
 Emmet Otter's Jug-Band Christmas (1977 TV)
 The Emoji Movie (2017)
 Emotional Backgammon (2003)
 Emperor: (2012 & 2020)
 The Emperor and the Assassin (1998)
 The Emperor in August (2015)
 The Emperor and the Golem (1952)
 The Emperor Jones: (1933 & 1955)
 Emperor of the North Pole (1973)
 The Emperor Waltz: (1948 & 1953)
 The Emperor's Club (2002)
 The Emperor's Naked Army Marches On (1987)
 The Emperor's New Clothes: (1961, 1966, 2001 & 2015)
 The Emperor's New Groove (2000)
 The Emperor's Secret (2006)
 The Emperor's Shadow (1996)
 Empire: (1964, 1986, 2002 & 2005 TV)
 Empire of the Ants (1977)
 Empire Falls (2005 TV)
 Empire of Light (2022)
 Empire of Passion (1978)
 Empire Records (1995)
 Empire State: (1987 & 2013)
 The Empire Strikes Back (1980)
 Empire of the Sun (1987)
 Employee of the Month: (2004 & 2006)
 Empress Chung (2005)
 The Empty Man (2020)

En

 En carne viva (1954)
 En Route (2004)
 Enakku 20 Unakku 18 (2004)
 Encanto (2021)
 Enchanted (2007)
 Enchanted April: (1935 & 1991)
 The Enchanted Cottage: (1924 & 1945)
 The Enchanting Enemy (1953)
 The Enchanting Shadow (1960)
 Enchantment (1921 & 1948)
 Encino Man (1992)
 Enclave (2015)
 Encore: (1951 & 1996)
 Encounter: (2013, 2018 & 2021)
 Encounters at the End of the World (2007)
 Encounters of the Spooky Kind (1980)
 Encounters of the Spooky Kind II (1990)
 Encrypt (2003) (TV)
 The End: (1978, 1998 & 2012)
 The End of the Affair: (1955 & 1999)
 End of the Century (2019)
 End of Days (1999)
 End of an Era (1994)
 The End of Evangelion (1997)
 End of the Line: (1987 & 2007)
 End of a Priest (1969)
 End of the Road (1970)
 The End of the Road: (1919, 1936, 1954 & 1976)
 End of the Spear (2006)
 The End of St. Petersburg (1927)
 The End of Suburbia (2004)
 The End of Summer (1961)
 The End of the Tour (2015)
 The End of Violence (1997)
 End of Watch (2012)
 End of the World: (1931 & 1977)
 The End of the World: (1916 & 1992)
 The End of the World and the Cat's Disappearance (2015)
 Ender's Game (2013)
 Endgame: (1983 & 1999)
 Endhiran (2010)
 The Endless (2017)
 Endless Desire (1958)
 Endless Love: (1981, 2014 American & 2014 Burmese)
 Endless Night: (1972 & 2015)
 Endless Nights in Aurora (2014)
 Endless Poetry (2016)
 The Endless River (2015)
 The Endless Summer (1966)
 Enduring Love (2004)
 Enemies, a Love Story (1989)
 Enemy: (1990, 2013 & 2021)
 The Enemy: (1916, 1927 & 1979)
 The Enemy Below (1958)
 Enemy at the Gates (2001)
 Enemy Mine (1985)
 Enemy of the State (1998)
 L'Enfance Nue (1968)
 L'Enfant (2005)
 Les Enfants Terribles (1950)
 Enforcement (2020)
 The Enforcer: (1951 & 1976)
 Enforcer from Death Row (1976)
 Engel & Joe (2001)
 England Is Mine (2017)
 The English Patient (1996)
 The English Teacher (2013)
 The Englishman who Went up a Hill but Came down a Mountain (1995)
 Enigma: (1982, 2001 & 2009)
 The Enigma of Kaspar Hauser (1974)
 Enlightenment Guaranteed (2002)
 Ennavale (2001)
 Enola Holmes (2020)
 Enola Holmes 2 (2022)
 Enough (2002)
 "#Enough" (2015)
 Enough Said (2013) 
 Enron: The Smartest Guys in the Room (2005)
 Ensign Pulver (1964)
 Enter Arsène Lupin (1944)
 Enter the Dragon (1973)
 Enter the Ninja (1981)
 Enter the Phoenix (2004)
 Enter the Void (2009)
 The Entertainer (1960)
 Entha Manchivaadavuraa (2020)
 The Entity (1983)
 Entourage (2015)
 Entr'acte (1924)
 Entrapment (1999)
 Entre Nous (1983)
 Envy: (2004 & 2009)

Ep–Eu

 Ephraim's Rescue (2013)
 Epic: (1984 & 2013)
 The Epic of Everest (1924)
 Epic Movie (2007)
 Epidemic (1987)
 Episode (1935)
 The Equalizer series:
 The Equalizer (2014)
 The Equalizer 2 (2018)
 The Equalizer 3 (2023)
 Equalizer 2000 (1987)
 The Equation of Love and Death (2008)
 Equilibrium (2002)
 Equinox: (1970, 1986 & 1992)
 Equinox Flower (1958)
 Equus (1977)
 Er Dong (2008)
 Eragon (2006)
 Erased: (2012, 2016 & 2018)
 Eraser (1996)
 Eraserhead (1977)
 Das Erbe (1935)
 Erik the Viking (1989)
 Erin Brockovich (2000)
 Ermo (1994)
 Ernest & Celestine (2012)
 Ernest P. Worrell series:
 Ernest in the Army (1998)
 Ernest Goes to Africa (1997)
 Ernest Goes to Camp (1987)
 Ernest Goes to Jail (1990)
 Ernest Goes to School (1994)
 Ernest Rides Again (1993)
 Ernest Saves Christmas (1988)
 Ernest Scared Stupid (1991)
 Slam Dunk Ernest (1995)
 The Ernie Game (1967)
 Ernst Thälmann (1954, 1955 sequel)
 Eroica: (1949, 1958 & 2003 TV)
 Eros (2004)
 Erotic Ghost Story (1990)
 Erotic Liaisons (1992)
 The Errand Boy (1961)
 Errementari (2017)
 Es geschah am hellichten Tag (1958 & 1997 TV)
 Escaflowne (2000)
 Escanaba in da Moonlight (2001)
 Escape: (1928, 1930, 1940, 1948, 2005, 2012 American & 2012 Norwegian)
 The Escape: (1914, 1926, 1928, 1939, 1944, 1972, 1998 TV, 2009, 2016 & 2017)
 Escape at Dawn (1950)
 Escape from Alcatraz (1979)
 Escape from the Bronx (1983)
 Escape from Fort Bravo (1953)
 Escape from Hong Kong Island (2004)
 Escape from L.A. (1996)
 Escape from the 'Liberty' Cinema (1990)
 Escape from Mars (1999) (TV)
 Escape from Mogadishu (2021)
 Escape from New York (1981)
 Escape from the Planet of the Apes (1971)
 Escape from Planet Earth (2013)
 Escape from Sobibor (1987) (TV)
 Escape from Suburbia (2007)
 Escape from Wildcat Canyon (1998)
 Escape from Zahrain (1962)
 Escape Me Never: (1935 & 1947)
 Escape Plan (2013)
 Escape Room (2019)
 Escape Room: Tournament of Champions (2021)
 Escape to Victory (1981)
 Escape to Witch Mountain: (1975 & 1995 TV)
 The Escapist: (2002 & 2008)
 Eskimo Limon (1978)
 Esmeralda: (1905, 1915 & 1922)
 Esper Mami: Hoshizora no Dancing Doll (1988)
 Essex Boys (2000)
 Est - Ouest (1999)
 The Estate (2020)
 Estate Violenta (1961)
 Esther: (1916, 1986 & 1999 TV)
 La estrategia del caracol (1993)
 The Eternal (1998)
 Eternal Beauty (2019)
 The Eternal City: (1915, 1923 & 2008)
 The Eternal Daughter (2022)
 The Eternal Jew (1940)
 Eternal Love: (1917 & 1929)
 Eternal Moment (2011)
 The Eternal Return (1943)
 The Eternal Return of Antonis Paraskevas (2013)
 The Eternal Road (2017)
 The Eternal Sea (1955)
 Eternal Summer: (2006 & 2015)
 Eternal Sunshine of the Spotless Mind (2004)
 The Eternal Waltz (1954)
 Eternals (2021)
 Eternity and a Day (1998)
 Etoile (1989)
 Eulogy (2004)
 Euphoria: (2006, 2017 & 2018)
 Eureka: (1984 & 2000)
 Europa: (1931, 1991 & 2021)
 Europa '51 (1952)
 Europa Europa (1990)
 Europa Report (2013)
 EuroTrip (2004)
 Euthanizer (2017)

Ev

Eva-Eve

 Eva: (1948, 1953, 1958, 1962, 2010, 2011 & 2018)
 Eva from Argentina (2011)
 Eva Doesn't Sleep (2015)
 Eva and the Grasshopper (1927)
 Eva & Leon (2015)
 Eva, ¿qué hace ese hombre en tu cama? (1975)
 Eva in Silk (1928)
 Eva, The Sin (1920)
 Eva tropí hlouposti (1939)
 Evadaithe Nakenti (2007)
 Evadi Gola Vaadidhi (2005)
 Evan Almighty (2007)
 Evandi Aavida Vachindi (1993)
 Evangeline: (1913, 1919, 1929 & 2013)
 Evangelion series:
 Evangelion: Death and Rebirth (1997)
 Evangelion: 1.0 You Are (Not) Alone (2007)
 Evangelion: 2.0 You Can (Not) Advance (2009)
 Evangelion: 3.0 You Can (Not) Redo (2012)
 Evangelion: 3.0+1.0 Thrice Upon a Time (2021)
 Evano Oruvan (2007)
 Evanukku Engeyo Matcham Irukku (2018)
 Evargal Indiyargal (1987)
 Evcilik Oyunu (1964)
 Evdokia (1971)
 Eve: (1968 & 2008)
 Eve of Destruction (1991)
 Eve in Exile (1919)
 Eve and the Fire Horse (2005)
 Eve and the Handyman (1961)
 Eve Knew Her Apples (1945)
 Eve and the Serpent (1949)
 Eve's Bayou (1997)
 Eve's Daughter (1918)
 Eve's Daughters (1928)
 Eve's Leaves (1926)
 Eve's Love Letters (1927)
 Eve's Lover (1925)
 Eve's Necklace (2010)
 Eve's Secret (1925)
 Evel Knievel: (1971 & 2004 TV)
 Evelyn (2002)
 Evelyn: The Cutest Evil Dead Girl (2002)
 Evelyn's Love Adventures (1921)
 Even Angels Eat Beans (1973)
 Even As You and I (1917)
 Even the Clouds Are Drifting (1959)
 Even Cowgirls Get the Blues (1993)
 Even Dwarfs Started Small (1970)
 Even as Eve (1920)
 Even Hitler Had a Girlfriend (1991)
 Even as IOU (1942)
 Even Lambs Have Teeth (2015)
 Even Lovers Get the Blues (2016)
 Even Money (2006)
 Even in My Dreams (2008)
 Even Pigeons Go to Heaven (2007)
 Even the Rain (2010)
 Even Though the Whole World Is Burning (2014)
 Even When I Fall (2017)
 Evening (2007)
 Evening Bell (1988)
 Evening Bells (1986)
 Evening in Byzantium (1978)
 Evening Clothes (1927)
 An Evening of Edgar Allan Poe (1970)
 An Evening with Kevin Smith (2002)
 Evening Land (1977)
 The Evening Star (1996)
 Evening – Night – Morning (1920)
 Evening of Roses (2009)
 Evening Shadows (2018)
 An Evening Visit (1934)
 Evenings (1989)
 Evenings for Sale (1932)
 Evensong (1934)
 Event Horizon (1997)
 Ever After (1998)
 Ever After The Musical (2015)
 Ever Been to the Moon? (2015)
 Ever in My Heart (1933)
 Ever Ready (1946)
 Ever Since Eve: (1921, 1934 & 1937)
 Ever Since Venus (1944)
 Ever Since We Love (2015)
 Eveready Harton in Buried Treasure (1928)
 Everest: (1998 & 2015)
 Everlasting Moments (2008)
 Everlasting Regret (2005)
 Every Breath You Take (2021)
 Every Child (1979)
 Every Day: (2010 & 2018)
 Every Girl Should Be Married (1948)
 Every Little Step (2008)
 Every Time I Die (2019)
 Every Which Way but Loose (1978)
 Everybody Has Secrets (2004)
 Everybody Knows (2018)
 Everybody in Our Family (2012)
 Everybody Wants Some!! (2016)
 Everybody Wins (1990)
 Everybody's All-American (1988)
 Everybody's Famous! (2000)
 Everybody's Fine: (2009 & 2016)
 Everyday: (2000 & 2012)
 Everyman's Feast (2002)
 Everynight ... Everynight (1994)
 Everyone Loves Mel (1998)
 Everyone Says I Love You (1996)
 Everyone's Hero (2006)
 Everything Everywhere All at Once (2022)
 Everything Goes (2004)
 Everything Is Illuminated (2005)
 Everything Must Go (2010)
 Everything You Always Wanted to Know About Sex* (*But Were Afraid to Ask) (1972)
 Everything's Gone Green (2006)

Evi-Evr

 The Evictors (1979)
 Evidam Swargamanu (2009)
 Evidence: (1915, 1922, 1929, 1988, 2012 & 2013)
 The Evidence of the Film (1913)
 Evil: (2003 & 2005)
 Evil Alien Conquerors (2002)
 Evil Aliens (2006)
 Evil Ambitions (1996)
 Evil Angel (2009)
 Evil Angels (1988)
 Evil Bong (2006)
 Evil Bong 2: King Bong (2009)
 Evil Bong 3D: The Wrath of Bong (2011)
 Evil Brain from Outer Space (1964)
 Evil Breed: The Legend of Samhain (2003)
 Evil Calls: The Raven (2011)
 Evil Cat (1987)
 Evil Clutch (1988) 
 The Evil Cult (1993)
 Evil Dead series:
 The Evil Dead (1981)
 Evil Dead II (1987)
 Army of Darkness (1992)
 Evil Dead (2013)
 Evil Dead Rise (2023)
 Evil Dead Trap (1988)
 Evil Dead Trap 3: Broken Love Killer (1993)
 Evil Ed (1995)
 Evil Eye (2020)
 The Evil Eye: (1917 & 1920)
 Evil Eyes (2004)
 The Evil of Frankenstein (1964)
 Evil Laugh (1986)
 The Evil That Men Do (1984)
 Evil Toons (1992)
 Evil Twin (2007)
 Evil Under the Sun (1982)
 The Evil Within: (1970 & 2017)
 Evil: In the Time of Heroes (2009)
 Evil's Evil Cousin (2016)
 Evilenko (2004)
 Evita: (1996 & 2008)
 Evolusi KL Drift (2008)
 Evolusi KL Drift 2 (2010)
 Evolution: (1971, 2001, 2015 & 2021)
 Evolution of a Filipino Family (2004)
 Evolution's Child (1999 TV)
 Evolver (1995)
 Evrydiki BA 2O37 (1975)

Ew-Ez

 "#Ewankosau saranghaeyo" (2015)
 Ewoks: The Battle for Endor (1985) (TV)
 The Ex: (1997 & 2007)
 Ex Fighting (2014)
 Ex Machina (2014)
 The Ex-File 3: The Return of the Exes (2017)
 Ex-Files (2014)
 Ex-Files 2 (2015)
 Exam: (2003 & 2009)
 The Exam: (2006 & 2011)
 Excalibur (1981)
 The Exception (2016)
 Excess Baggage: (1928, 1933 & 1997)
 Exclusive (1937)
 The Exclusive: Beat the Devil's Tattoo (2015)
 Execution in Autumn (1972)
 Execution Squad (1972)
 The Executioner: (1963, 1970, 1975 & 1990)
 The Executioner's Song (1982) (TV)
 Executioners (1993)
 Executioners from Shaolin (1977)
 Executive Action (1973)
 Executive Decision (1996)
 Executive Suite (1954)
 Exile: (1917, 1994, 2012, 2016 & 2020)
 The Exile: (1914, 1922, 1931 & 1947)
 Exiled: (2006 & 2019)
 The Exiles: (1923 & 1961)
 eXistenZ (1999)
 Exit to Eden (1994)
 Exit Through the Gift Shop (2010)
 Exit Wounds (2001)
 Exodus: (1960, 2007 British, 2007 Hong Kong, 2015 & 2020)
 Exodus: Gods and Kings (2014)
 Exodus: Tales from the Enchanted Kingdom (2005)
 The Exorcism of Emily Rose (2005)
 The Exorcist series:
 The Exorcist (1973)
 Exorcist II: The Heretic (1977)
 The Ninth Configuration (1980)
 The Exorcist III (1990)
 Exorcist: The Beginning (2004)
 Dominion: Prequel to the Exorcist (2005)
 Exotica (1994)
 Expedition: Bismarck (2002) (TV)
 Expelled: No Intelligence Allowed (2008)
 The Expendables: (1988 & 2000 TV)
 The Expendables series:
 The Expendables (2010)
 The Expendables 2 (2012)
 The Expendables 3 (2014)
 The Expendables 4 (2023)
 Das Experiment (2001)
 The Experiment: (1922 & 2010)
 Experiment Perilous (1944)
 Experiment in Terror (1962)
 Experiments in the Revival of Organisms (1940)
 The Expert: (1932 & 1995)
 The Experts: (1973 & 1989)
 The Exploits of Elaine (1914)
 The Explorer (1915)
 Explorers (1985)
 Exponát roku 1827 (2008)
 Exporting Raymond (2010) 
 The Express (2008)
 Expresso Bongo (1959)
 The Expulsion (1923)
 The Exterminating Angel (1962)
 The Exterminator (1980)
 Exterminator 2 (1984)
 Extinct (2021)
 The Extra: (1962 & 2005)
 The Extra Man (2010)
 Extra Ordinary (2019)
 Extra Terrestrial Visitors (1983)
 Extract (2009)
 Extraction: (2015 & 2020)
 Extraction 2 (TBD)
 The Extraordinary Adventures of Adèle Blanc-Sec (2010)
 The Extraordinary Adventures of Mr. West in the Land of the Bolsheviks (1924)
 Extraordinary Measures (2010)
 Extraordinary Mission (2017)
 The Extreme Adventures of Super Dave (2000)
 Extreme Closeups (2003)
 Extreme Measures (1996)
 Extreme Ops (2002)
 Extreme Prejudice (1987)
 An Extremely Goofy Movie (2000)
 Extremely Loud and Incredibly Close (2012)
 Extremities (1986)
 The Eye series:
 The Eye (2002)
 The Eye 2 (2004)
 The Eye 10 (2005)
 The Eye (2008)
 Eye of the Beholder (2000)
 Eye of the Devil (1967)
 Eye for an Eye: (1996, 2008 & 2019)
 An Eye for an Eye: (1966, 1981 & 2016)
 Eye of the Needle (1981)
 Eye in the Sky: (2007 & 2015)
 Eye of the Storm: (1991 & 2015)
 The Eye of the Storm: (1970, 2009 & 2011)
 The Eyes of Annie Jones (1964)
 Eyes of Fire (1983)
 Eyes of Laura Mars (1978)
 The Eyes of My Mother (2016)
 Eye See You (2002)
 Eyes of a Stranger: (1970 & 1981)
 The Eyes of Tammy Faye: (2000 & 2021)
 Eyes Wide Shut (1999)
 Eyes Without a Face (1960)
 Eyewitness (1981)
 Ezra (2007)

Previous:  List of films: D    Next:  List of films: F

See also 
 Lists of films
 Lists of actors
 List of film and television directors
 List of documentary films
 List of film production companies

-